Tough Guy or Chicken? is a 2009 reality television series shown on BBC Three. It involves five young British men spending four months travelling the world taking tough challenges with deadly animals and in hostile locations. The series is made up of 8 episodes where, in each, the men are taken to a different part of the world to take on the different challenges that await them. If they are not up for the tasks required of them they fail the given challenge.

Ross Edgley, who was then 22 years old, took part.

Series 1 (2009)

Results

See also
Last Man Standing (UK TV series)

External links
 BBC page for Tough Guy or Chicken?
IMDB Tough Guy or Chicken?

2009 British television series debuts